Little Rock is the second studio album by American singer-songwriter Hayes Carll.

The album topped the Billboard Americana chart, the first self-released album to do so.

Critical reception
The Austin Chronicle called the album "an Americana gem." Exclaim! wrote that it "shows yet another talented Texas troubadour bound for greatness." The Houston Press called it "wordy and witty enough to impress the Americana snobs, but plenty country enough for the dancehall crowd."

Track listing 
 Wish I Hadn't Stayed So Long – 3:44
 Take Me Away (John Evans and Adam Carroll) – 4:12
 Down The Road Tonight – 3:38
 Good Friends – 3:27
 Hey Baby Where You Been – 2:59
 Rivertown (Hayes Carll, Guy Clark) – 4:37
 Little Rock – 3:05
 Leave Here Standing – 2:40
 Sit In With The Band (Hayes Carll, John Evans) – 2:31
 Long Way Home – 4:46
 Chickens (Hayes Carll, Ray Wylie Hubbard) – 4:32

Personnel 
 Hayes Carll – Acoustic guitar, vocals
 Kenny Vaughn – Electric guitar, acoustic guitar, National
 Jared Reynolds – Bass
 Jimmy Lester – Drums
 Allison Moorer – Vocals
 R.S. Field – Percussion, drums, Raka Raka guitar
 Bucky Baxter – Steel, backing vocals
 Adam Landry – Acoustic guitar
 George Bradfute – Bass

References 

Hayes Carll albums
2005 albums